The R816 road is a regional road in Dublin, Ireland.

The official definition of the R816 from the Roads Act, 1993 (Classification of Regional Roads) Order, 2012  states:

R816: Baggot Street, Dublin

Between its junction with R138 at Pembroke Street Lower and its junction with R118 at Northumberland Road via Baggot Street Lower, Baggot Street Upper and Pembroke Road all in the city of Dublin.

See also
Roads in Ireland
Regional road

References

Regional roads in the Republic of Ireland
Roads in County Dublin